was the twenty-sixth single of J-pop girl group Morning Musume, from the group's seventh album Rainbow 7. It was released on April 27, 2005 under the Zetima label, and went on to sell a total of 59,287 copies. The single reached a peak of #2 on the weekly Oricon chart, charting for five weeks. The Single V, released on the same day, went on to sell a total of 30,324 copies. The Single V reached a peak of #6 on the weekly Oricon chart, charting for four weeks.

History
The limited edition of the single came in special packaging, and both the limited and first press of the normal edition came with photocards featuring members of the group (the limited edition containing five cards, while the normal edition only contained one). Buyers of the single or Single V were given the opportunity to send in a form to be eligible for a chance to receive a special 8 cm CD (limited to 10,000 copies) containing Ishikawa's comments on her graduation.

The titular song is sung in Osaka-ben. Producer Tsunku wrote all lyrics on the single and composed both songs, with arrangement by Hideyuki "Daichi" Suzuki and Yuichi Takahashi. The song's lyrics are meant to sound and mean different things in different languages. As producer, Tsunku asked the girls to study about Osaka in preparation for the single. The coupling song, "Nature is Good!", was used as the theme and image song for the Asahi Broadcasting Corporation's programme  between April and June 2005.

This was the first single since the departure of the final founding member, Kaori Iida, and the last single to feature Rika Ishikawa, who graduated to focus on her activities within V-u-den. This was also Mari Yaguchi's last single with the group, prior to her shock immediate departure two weeks before the release of the single, due to a scandal she was involved in. The CD artwork does, however, still feature Yaguchi, as does the music video.

The song was covered by Tsunku on his album Type 2. Member Ai Takahashi performed a solo version of the song at Morning Musume's spring 2006 concert.

Track listings

Charts

CD

Single V DVD

Personnel
Mari Yaguchi – minor vocals
Rika Ishikawa – main vocals
Hitomi Yoshizawa – minor vocals
Ai Takahashi – main vocals
Asami Konno – minor vocals
Makoto Ogawa – minor vocals
Risa Niigaki – center vocals
Miki Fujimoto – main vocals
Eri Kamei – minor vocals
Sayumi Michishige – minor vocals
Reina Tanaka – center vocals
Track 1
Atsuko Inaba (chorus)
Tsunku (chorus)
Hideyuki "Daichi" Suzuki (programming, guitar, arrangement)
Track 2
Yuichi Takahashi (arrangement)

Members at time of single
 2nd generation: Mari Yaguchi 
 4th generation: Rika Ishikawa , Hitomi Yoshizawa
 5th generation: Ai Takahashi, Asami Konno, Makoto Ogawa, Risa Niigaki
 6th generation: Miki Fujimoto, Eri Kamei, Sayumi Michishige, Reina Tanaka

References

External links 
Discography entry at the Up-Front Works official site

Morning Musume songs
Zetima Records singles
2005 singles
Song recordings produced by Tsunku
Japanese-language songs
Songs written by Tsunku
2005 songs
Japanese synth-pop songs
Songs about heartache
Dance-pop songs